

Introduction 
Ambio 4 was quadrophonic sound technology commercialised in the early 1970s that could reproduce the ambience or sound information of a room as well as play stereo.  Ambiophony was an extension of stereo reproduction to enhance the sense of realism and it could be used with nearly all stereo programme materials.

The technology was included in receivers, amplifiers and music centres from manufacturers including Philips, Ferguson Electronics and Bang and Olufsen alongside mono and stereo playback.  The electronics behind Ambiophony was based on, or similar to, the Hafler circuit.

References 

Audio electronics